Martin Locke (born 21 August 1970) is an Australian former rugby league footballer who played for the South Queensland Crushers and North Queensland Cowboys in the 1990s and 2000s. He primarily played .

Playing career
In 1989, after representing the Queensland under-19 team, Locke signed with the Brisbane Broncos. Locke spent four years with the club, playing in the under-21 and reserve grade competitions. In 1995, Locke signed with the newly formed South Queensland Crushers.

In Round 4 of the 1995 ARL season, Locke made his first grade debut in the Crushers' 0–32 loss to the Broncos' at ANZ Stadium. Locke played 17 games for the Crushers in his rookie season, scoring one try. In 1996, he joined the North Queensland Cowboys and won the club's Club Person of the Year award. Locke spent five seasons at the club, before retiring at the end of the 2000 season.

Achievements and accolades

Individual
North Queensland Cowboys Club Person of the Year: 1996, 2002

Statistics

NRL
 Statistics are correct to the end of the 2000 season

Post-playing career
After retiring, Locke became the Cowboys' business development manager. In 2002, he won the club's Club Person of the Year award for the second time. Since 2010, Locke has been the director of Martin Locke Homes in Townsville.

References

1970 births
Living people
Australian rugby league players
South Queensland Crushers players
North Queensland Cowboys players
Rugby league players from Queensland
Rugby league props